Hisonotus montanus is a species of catfish in the family Loricariidae. It is known only from the Canoas River drainage in Brazil and reaches 4.5 cm (1.8 inches) SL. The specific epithet of this fish, montanus, derives from its tendency to be found at altitudes of roughly 850 m or 2789 ft above sea level, marking it as the species of Hisonotus that occurs at the highest elevation of those native to the Uruguay River basin.

References 

Otothyrinae
Species described in 2009
Uruguay (biota) articles